The Sir David Williams Professorship of Public Law is a professorship in English public law, and one of 21 professorships in law at the University of Cambridge. It is named in honour of Sir David Williams, who was Rouse Ball Professor of English Law and Vice-chancellor of the University of Cambridge, and was created with the aim of reflecting and reinforcing the tradition of public law at Cambridge. The professorship is funded with contributions from Sir David Li, the Li family, Robinson College, Cambridge, described at the time as "the most significant benefaction to the Faculty in recent times".

Its holders are chosen based on international recognition in the field of public law, an outstanding record in research and publication, strategic vision and commitment to developing public law scholarship within the University of Cambridge, and the Faculty of Law's profile within that field, and their commitment to excellence in learning and teaching. The incumbent is entitled to a professorial fellowship at Robinson College.

The incumbent is Alison Young, who was formerly Professor of Public Law at the University of Oxford. She was elected on 1 January 2018.

Sir David Williams Professors of Public Law

See also 

 Rouse Ball Professor of English Law
 Regius Professor of Civil Law (Cambridge)

References 

Public Law, Williams, Sir David
Public Law, Williams, Sir David
School of the Humanities and Social Sciences, University of Cambridge
2016 establishments in England